Cola is a genus of moths of the family Erebidae. The genus was erected by Harrison Gray Dyar Jr. in 1914.

Species
Cola nabis Dyar, 1914
Cola nagadeboides Strand, 1919

References

Calpinae